Simone Marie Ruas (10 June 1919 – 14 January 2001) was a French athlete. She competed in the women's high jump at the 1948 Summer Olympics.

References

1919 births
2001 deaths
Athletes (track and field) at the 1948 Summer Olympics
French female high jumpers
Olympic athletes of France
20th-century French women